In mathematics, the circle group, denoted by  or , is the multiplicative group of all complex numbers with absolute value 1, that is, the unit circle in the complex plane or simply the unit complex numbers

Since  is abelian, it follows that  is as well.

A unit complex number in the circle group represents a rotation of the complex plane about the origin and can be parametrized by the angle measure :

This is the exponential map for the circle group.

The circle group plays a central role in Pontryagin duality and in the theory of Lie groups.

The notation  for the circle group stems from the fact that, with the standard topology (see below), the circle group is a 1-torus.

The circle group is isomorphic to the special orthogonal group .

Elementary introduction 

For example, the diagram illustrates how to add 150° to 270°. Therefore, we adjust our answer by 360°, which gives ).

Another description is in terms of ordinary (real) addition, where only numbers between 0 and 1 are allowed (with 1 corresponding to a full rotation: 360° or ), i.e. the real numbers modulo the integers:  This can be achieved by throwing away the digits occurring before the decimal point. For example, when we work out  the answer is 1.1666..., but we may throw away the leading 1, so the answer (in the circle group) is just      with some preference to 0.166..., because

Topological and analytic structure
The circle group is more than just an abstract algebraic object. It has a natural topology when regarded as a subspace of the complex plane.

One can say even more. The circle is a 1-dimensional real manifold, and multiplication and inversion are real-analytic maps on the circle. This gives the circle group the structure of a one-parameter group, an instance of a Lie group. In fact, up to isomorphism, it is the unique 1-dimensional compact, connected Lie group.

Isomorphisms
The circle group shows up in a variety of forms in mathematics. We list some of the more common forms here. Specifically, we show that

Note that the slash (/) denotes here quotient group.

The set of all 1×1 unitary matrices clearly coincides with the circle group; the unitary condition is equivalent to the condition that its element have absolute value 1.

The exponential function gives rise to a group homomorphism  from the additive real numbers  to the circle group  via the map

The last equality is Euler's formula or the complex exponential. The real number θ corresponds to the angle (in radians) on the unit circle as measured counterclockwise from the positive x axis. That this map is a homomorphism follows from the fact that the multiplication of unit complex numbers corresponds to addition of angles:

However, it is not injective. By the first isomorphism theorem we then have that

If complex numbers are realized as 2×2 real matrices (see complex number), the unit complex numbers correspond to 2×2 orthogonal matrices with unit determinant. Specifically, we have

This function shows that the circle group is isomorphic to the special orthogonal group  since

where  is matrix multiplication.

This isomorphism has the geometric interpretation that multiplication by a unit complex number is a proper rotation in the complex (and real) plane, and every such rotation is of this form.

Properties
Every compact Lie group  of dimension > 0 has a subgroup isomorphic to the circle group. This means that, thinking in terms of symmetry, a compact symmetry group acting continuously can be expected to have one-parameter circle subgroups acting; the consequences in physical systems are seen, for example, at rotational invariance and spontaneous symmetry breaking.

Representations
The representations of the circle group are easy to describe. It follows from Schur's lemma that the irreducible complex representations of an abelian group are all 1-dimensional. Since the circle group is compact, any representation

Therefore, the irreducible representations of the circle group are just the homomorphisms from the circle group to itself.

These representations are all inequivalent. The representation  is conjugate to :

These representations are just the characters of the circle group.

The irreducible real representations of the circle group are the trivial representation (which is 1-dimensional) and the representations

Group structure
The circle group  is a divisible group.

The number of copies of  must be  (the cardinality of the continuum) in order for the cardinality of the direct sum to be correct. Thus

The isomorphism

See also

 Group of rational points on the unit circle
 One-parameter subgroup
 -sphere
 Orthogonal group
 Phase factor (application in quantum-mechanics)
 Rotation number
 Solenoid

Notes

References

Further reading
 Hua Luogeng (1981) Starting with the unit circle, Springer Verlag, .

External links
Homeomorphism and the Group Structure on a Circle

Lie groups